The men's K-4 1000 metres event was a fours kayaking event conducted as part of the Canoeing at the 2000 Summer Olympics program.

Medalists

Results

Heats
13 crews entered in two heats. The top three finishers in each heat advanced to the final while the remaining teams competed in the semifinal.

Overall Results Heats

Yugoslavia is shown as Serbia and Montenegro (SCG) in the sports-reference.com website.

Semifinals
The top three finishers in the semifinal advanced to the final.

Final

Germany won the K-4 1000 m world championships in 1997 and 1998 while Hungary won in 1999. Germany won the European championships in July 2000, but the Hungarians won the Olympic final by about 2.5 meter (8 feet).

References
2000 Summer Olympics Canoe sprint results. 
Sports-reference.com 2000 K-4 1000 m results.
Wallechinsky, David and Jaime Loucky (2008). "Canoeing: Men's Kayak Fours 1000 Meters". In The Complete Book of the Olympics: 2008 Edition. London: Aurum Press Limited. p. 478.

Men's K-4 1000
Men's events at the 2000 Summer Olympics